The 2021 Betfred World Matchplay was the 28th annual staging of the World Matchplay, organised by the Professional Darts Corporation. The tournament returned to the Winter Gardens, from 17 to 25 July 2021, with the 2020 staging of the event having been moved to the Marshall Arena, Milton Keynes due to the disruption caused by the COVID-19 pandemic.

Dimitri Van den Bergh was the defending champion, after beating Gary Anderson 18–10 in the 2020 final. However he was defeated by Peter Wright 18–9 in the final. Wright won his first World Matchplay, and became the fifth player to win both the PDC World Championship and the World Matchplay.

Prize money
The prize fund remained at £700,000, with the winner's earnings being £150,000.

Format
All games have to be won by two clear legs, with a game being extended if necessary for a maximum of six extra legs before a tie-break leg is required. For example, in a first to 10 legs first round match, if the score reaches 12–12 then the 25th leg will be the decider.

The first round is played first to 10 legs, second round first to 11 legs, quarter-finals first to 16 legs, semi-finals first to 17 legs and final first to 18 legs.

Qualification
The top 16 players on the PDC Order of Merit at the cut-off point on 10 July were seeded for the tournament. The top 16 players on the ProTour Order of Merit, not to have already qualified on the cut-off date were unseeded. The ProTour Order of Merit took all events from the 2020 Players Championship 14 on 11 September 2020 up until 2021 Players Championship 20 on 9 July 2021.

Mensur Suljović originally qualified through the ProTour Order of Merit, but withdrew due to medical reasons. Jermaine Wattimena replaced him.

The following players qualified for the tournament:

PDC Order of Merit
  (quarter-finals)
  (champion)
  (semi-finals)
  (first round)
  (second round)
  (second round)
  (quarter-finals)
   (runner-up)
  (second round)
  (second round)
  (quarter-finals)
  (first round)
  (semi-finals)
  (first round)
  (second round)
  (second round)

PDC ProTour qualifiers
  (first round)
  (first round)
  (first round)
  (first round)
  (first round)
  (first round)
 
  (first round)
  (first round)
  (second round)
  (first round)
  (first round)
  (first round)
  (second round)
  (quarter-finals)
  (first round)
  (first round)

Schedule

Draw

Statistics

General
{|class="wikitable sortable" style="font-size: 95%; text-align: right"
|-
! Player
! Eliminated
! Played
! Legs Won
! Legs Lost
! 100+
! 140+
! 180s
! High checkout
! Checkout Av.%
! Average
|-
|align="left"||Winner'''
| 5
| 
| 
| 
| 
| 
|149
|48.00
|104.37
|-
|align="left"|
|Runner-up
| 5
| 
| 
| 
| 
| 
|128
|35.59
|99.99
|-
|align="left"|
|Semi-final
| 4
| 
| 
| 
| 
| 
|140
|36.80
|98.85
|-
|align="left"|
|Semi-final
| 4
| 
| 
| 
| 
| 
|127
|41.23
|98.11
|-
|align="left"|
|
| 3
| 
| 
| 
| 
| 
|136
|43.48
|97.14
|-
|align="left"|
|
| 3
| 
| 
| 
| 
| 
|130
|25.00
|94.59
|-
|align="left"| 
|
| 3
| 
| 
| 
| 
| 
|132
|38.96
|98.62
|-
|align="left"| 
| Quarter-finals
| 3
| 
| 
| 
| 
| 
|170
|45.31
|87.52
|-

|align="left"| 
| Second round
| 2
| 
| 
| 
| 
| 
| 121
| 30.61
| 99.66
|-
| align="left"| 
| 
| 2
| 
| 
| 
| 
| 
| 116
| 40.38
| 97.63
|-
|align="left"| 
| Second round
| 2
| 
| 
| 
| 
| 
| 132
| 33.33
| 97.48
|-
|align="left"| 
| Second round
| 2
| 
| 
| 
| 
| 
| 161
| 64.29
| 96.79
|-
|align="left"| 
| Second round
| 2
| 
| 
| 
| 
| 
| 161
| 35.14
| 96.39
|-
|align="left"| 
| Second round
| 2
| 
| 
| 
| 
| 
| 149
| 37.25
| 96.07
|-
|align="left"| 
| Second round
| 2
| 
| 
| 
| 
| 
| 92
| 51.72
| 94.43
|-
|align="left"| 
| Second round
| 2
| 
| 
| 
| 
| 
| 117
| 37.25
| 93.94
|-
|align="left"| 
| First round
| 1
| 
| 
| 
| 
| 
| 78
| 40.00
| 97.06
|-
|align="left"| 
| First round
| 1
| 
| 
| 
| 
| 
| 121
| 33.33
| 96.08
|-
|align="left"| 
| First round
| 1
| 
| 
| 
| 
| 
| 129
| 34.78
| 94.37
|-
|align="left"| 
| First round
| 1
| 
| 
| 
| 
| 
| 130
| 36.84
| 94.34
|-
|align="left"| 
| First round
| 1
| 
| 
| 
| 
| 
| 148
| 21.43
| 93.48
|-
|align="left"| 
| First round
| 1
| 
| 
| 
| 
| 
| 164
| 33.33
| 92.72
|-
|align="left"| 
| First round
| 1
| 
| 
| 
| 
| 
| 62
| 28.57
| 92.38
|-
|align="left"| 
| First round
| 1
| 
| 
| 
| 
| 
| 40
| 15.38
| 92.14
|-
|align="left"| 
| First round
| 1
| 
| 
| 
| 
| 
| 52
| 20.00
| 92.08
|-
|align="left"| 
| First round
| 1
| 
| 
| 
| 
| 
| 98
| 38.89
| 92.00
|-
|align="left"| 
| First round
| 1
| 
| 
| 
| 
| 
| 81
| 47.06
| 91.48
|-
|align="left"| 
| First round
| 1
| 
| 
| 
| 
| 
| 84
| 43.75
| 90.22
|-
|align="left"| 
| First round
| 1
| 
| 
| 
| 
| 
| 116
| 33.33
| 84.90
|-
|align="left"| 
| 
| 1
| 
| 
| 
| 
| 
| 60
| 41.67
| 84.42
|-
|align="left"| 
| First round
| 1
| 
| 
| 
| 
| 
| 72
| 35.71
| 84.05
|-
|align="left"| 
| First round
| 1
| 
| 
| 
| 
| 
| 90
| 17.14
| 84.03
|-

Top averages
This table shows the highest averages achieved by players throughout the tournament.

Representation
This table shows the number of players by country in the 2021 World Matchplay. A total of 11 nationalities are represented.

References

World Matchplay (darts)
World Matchplay
World Matchplay
World Matchplay